Oxbow National Wildlife Refuge is a property of the United States National Wildlife Refuge (NWR) system located in Middlesex and Worcester counties in Massachusetts.  It was founded in 1974.

Description
The Refuge lies within the towns of Ayer and Shirley in Middlesex County and the towns of Harvard and Lancaster in Worcester County.

Origins
Oxbow National Wildlife Refuge was formed by three land transfers from the U.S. Army's Fort Devens military installation, and a recent purchase of private land in Harvard. Two of the transfers from the Army (May 1974 and February 1988) formed the original  portion of the Refuge located south of Massachusetts Route 2. The third Army transfer occurred in May 1999, and added the  portion of the Refuge that is located north of Route 2.

Wildlife and habitat
The primary purpose for which the Refuge was created is its "...particular value in carrying out the national migratory bird management program."

The Refuge's interspersion of wetland, forested upland and old field habitats is ideally suited for this purpose. The Refuge supports a diverse mix of migratory birds including waterfowl, wading birds, raptors, shorebirds, passerines, as well as resident mammals, reptiles, amphibians, fish and invertebrates. The extensive and regionally significant wetlands occurring on and adjacent to the Oxbow Refuge, including their associated tributary drainages and headwaters, have been listed as a priority for protection under both the North American Waterfowl Management Plan and the Emergency Wetlands Resources Act of 1986. The portion of the Oxbow NWR south of Route 2 lies within the 12,900-acre Central Nashua River Valley Area of Critical Environmental Concern (ACEC) designated by the Massachusetts Secretary of Environmental Affairs, and the portions of the Refuge north of Route 2 are included in the Squannassit ACEC due to the unique environmental characteristics and values of these wildlife habitats.

Friends group
The Refuge has an active friends group, The Friends of the Oxbow National Wildlife Refuge, which helps notify people about U.S. Fish & Wildlife Service activities in the Refuge, and also sponsors its own activities in and around the Refuge.

References

External links
 Oxbow National Wildlife Refuge

National Wildlife Refuges in Massachusetts
Protected areas of Middlesex County, Massachusetts
Protected areas of Worcester County, Massachusetts
Protected areas established in 1974
Wetlands of Massachusetts
Landforms of Middlesex County, Massachusetts
Landforms of Worcester County, Massachusetts
1974 establishments in Massachusetts